Willem Janszoon Blaeu (157121 October 1638), also abbreviated to Willem Jansz. Blaeu, was a Dutch cartographer, atlas maker and publisher. Along with his son Johannes Blaeu, Willem is considered one of the notable figures of the Netherlandish or Dutch school of cartography during its golden age in the 16th and 17th centuries.

Biography
Blaeu was born at Uitgeest or Alkmaar. As the son of a well-to-do herring salesman, he was destined to succeed his father in the trade, but his interests lay more in mathematics and astronomy. Between 1594 and 1596, as a student of the Danish astronomer Tycho Brahe, he qualified as an instrument and globe maker. During this time in 1596, his son Joan Blaeu was born and he would also become a well established cartographer. Later in 1600 Willem discovered the second ever variable star, now known as P Cygni.

Once he returned to Holland, he made country maps and world globes, and as he possessed his own printing works, he was able to regularly produce country maps in an atlas format, some of which appeared in the Atlas Novus published in 1635. In 1633 he was appointed map-maker of the Dutch East India Company. He was also an editor and published works of Willebrord Snell, Descartes, Adriaan Metius, Roemer Visscher, Gerhard Johann Vossius, Barlaeus, Hugo Grotius, Vondel and the historian and poet Pieter Corneliszoon Hooft.  He died in Amsterdam.

He had two sons, Johannes and Cornelis Blaeu, who continued their father's mapmaking and publishing business after his death in 1638. Prints of the family's works are still sold today. Original maps are rare collector items.

Blaeu's maps were featured in the works of the Dutch painter Johannes Vermeer of Delft (1632–1675), who holds a position of great honor among map historians. Several of his paintings illustrate maps hanging on walls or globes standing on tables or cabinets. Vermeer painted these cartographical documents with such detail that it is often possible to identify the actual maps. Evidently, Vermeer was particularly attached to a Willem Blaeu – Balthasar Florisz van Berckenrode map of Holland and West Friesland, as he represented it as a wall decoration in three of his paintings. Though no longer extant, the map's existence is known from archival sources and the second edition published by Willem Blaeu in 1621, titled Nova et Accurata Totius Hollandiae Westfriesiaeq. Topographia, Descriptore Balthazaro Florentio a Berke[n]rode Batavo. Vermeer must have had a copy at his disposal (or the earlier one published by Van Berckenrode). Around 1658 he showed it as a wall decoration in his painting Officer and Laughing Girl, which depicts a soldier in a large hat sitting with his back to viewer, talking with a smiling girl who holds a glass in her hand. Bright sunlight bathes the girl and the large map on the wall. Vermeer's gift for realism is evidenced by the fact that the wall map, mounted on linen and wooden rods, is identifiable as Blaeu's 1621 map of Holland and West Friesland. He captures faithfully its characteristic design, decoration, and geographic content.

Legacy

His maps formed the bulk of the Atlas Maior, which became a collector's item in Amsterdam.

Works published by Willem Blaeu   
 Aardglobe (1599)
 Hemelglobe (1603)
 Nieuw Graetboeck (1605)
 Nywe Paskaerte (1606)
  't Licht der zeevaert (1608)
 Spieghel der Schrijfkonste (1609) 
 "Nova et Accurata Totius Hollandiae Westfriesiaeq. Topographia, Descriptore Balthazaro Florentio a Berke[n]rode Batavo"
 Tafelen van de declinatie der Sonne (1623)
 Tafelen van de breedte van de opgang der Sonne
 Zeespiegel, inhoudende een korte onderwysinghe inde konst der zeevaert, en beschryvinghe der seen en kusten van de oostersche, noordsche, en westersche schipvaert (1624)
 Pascaarte van alle de zeecusten van Europa (1625)
 . 
 Atlantis Appendix (1630) 
 Appendix Theatri ... et Atlantis ... (1631) 
 Atlas (1634) 
 Novus Atlas (1635) 
 Theatrum Orbis Terrarum (1635) 
 Toonneel des Aerdrycks (1635)  
 Le Theatre du Monde (1635) 
 Theatre du monde ou Nouvel Atlas (1638)

See also
 Hessel Gerritsz
 
 History of cartography

References

Literature 
 
 P. J. H. Baudet: Leven en werken van Willem Jansz. Blaeu, Utrecht 1871.
 Johannes Keuning and Marijke Donkersloot-de Vrij (Edited): Willem Jansz. Blaeu: a biography and history of his work as cartographer and publisher, Amsterdam 1973.

External links

 Galileo Project facts on Willem Blaeu
 
Selection of scanned maps by Willem Blaeu, Eran Laor Cartographic Collection, The National Library of Israel. List in Library catalog.
 Willem Blaeu Het Licht der Zee-vaert, Amsterdam 1608, Universitätsbibliothek Marburg – book published by Willem
 "Making Sense of the Pre-Columbian", Vistas: Visual Culture in Spanish America, 1520–1820. – explains how Willem's maps perpetuated the European notion of America's Indians

1571 births
1638 deaths
16th-century Dutch cartographers
People from Alkmaar
People from Uitgeest
17th-century Dutch cartographers
Dutch East India Company people
Dutch celestial cartography in the Age of Discovery